Foravirumab is  a monoclonal antibody for the prophylaxis of rabies. It is under development by Sanofi/Crucell.

References 

Monoclonal antibodies
Experimental drugs